Rasika Mathur is an American actress/comedian best known for her recurring role on the original version of Wild 'N Out.

Early life
Mathur was born in Ottawa, Ontario, Canada, to Hindu immigrant parents from India, but grew up in Houston, Texas and attended Albright Middle School in Alief, Texas and Elsik High School. She discovered her comedic side in seventh grade, after a teacher asked her to feed her dog while she was away: "That teacher soon said to me, 'Take my acting class' and I did, and it was amazing. I got to free up my inner weirdo.  Once we got to draw masks, and everyone loved the lion I drew. Something was always in me, roaring quietly, ready to be unleashed. (Ha, that was a cool metaphor.) Soon, out poured all the funny voices, silly characters, and hilarious wit that had built up inside me."

At the University of Texas at Austin, she studied creative advertising with a minor in Japanese and was active in the Student Association.

Comedy career
After college, she moved to Chicago and worked as a copywriter at a large advertising firm, while at night she studied improvisation at The Second City Training Center: "I day-jobbed and had an improv affair with Second City by night. Still have the hickeys to prove it." She also performed with Stir Friday Night!, a Chicago-based Asian American sketch comedy troupe.

After moving to LA to film a pilot that did not get picked up, Mathur faced difficulty:
Now I was living out of the trunk of my car. Mooching. Being broke. I mean broke like, you want to go out to eat late night with friends and you’re holding back tears reading the menu, having to make sure the side of eggs is really $1.49 and not $2.49, ’cause otherwise you just won’t eat. The vine I was trying to swing to wasn’t quite in front of me yet, so sometimes I had to grab a hold of air. To make ends meet I had to cater waitering. Being a children’s party clown or Dora the Explorer with a football-shaped head. Serving whiny, bandaid-on-their-forehead customers at Starbucks at 5 a.m. Graveyard shifts at Dr. Phil’s studios. It was a nightmare. But I also realized that I needed to keep my eyes open to the comedy in all those situations, and back-pocket it to use on stage, like during shows at IO-West, or in improv classes at the Groundlings. That kept me going.

She continues to perform stand-up around the country. She appeared on the show Wild'N Out on MTV2, where she kissed Lauren Flans, another former cast member. Her influences are Christopher Guest, Chevy Chase, Three Amigos, Saturday Night Live (the David Spade years) In Living Color, Adam Sandler, The Count, Ben Stiller, Vince Vaughn, Woody Allen and Diane Keaton.

"The Sari (W)rap"
Mathur's debut musical comedy album, "The Sari (W)rap", was released in November 2010 on Rukus Avenue Records.

Filmography

Film

Television

References

External links

Rasika Mathur profile on MTV Desi
One Woman Show, Nirali Magazine, June 2005
Rasika Mathur profile on Wild 'N Out
Precipice Productions
Rasika Mathur in Deserted ("Lost" Parody) Webisodes
"Funny Brown Female": Interview by Ranjit Souri in India Currents magazine
"International Musical Comedy Icon": Interview by Parimal M. Rohit in 'Buzzine' magazine

1976 births
American film actresses
American actresses of Indian descent
American television actresses
Living people
Actresses from Houston
Actresses from Ottawa
21st-century American women